Jazz Portraits: Mingus in Wonderland is a live album by jazz bassist and composer Charles Mingus, recorded in 1959 and released on the United Artists label in September of that year. The original release was titled Jazz Portraits, and a subsequent edition was titled Wonderland, leading to the combined title of Jazz Portraits: Mingus in Wonderland.

Composition
Both "Alice's Wonderland" and "Nostalgia in Times Square" were originally written for the 1959 John Cassavetes film Shadows as part of a full soundtrack, but Mingus’ music was almost entirely replaced for the final version of the film. A partial reconstruction of the soundtrack was released in 2015 as the compilation album Shadows.

A reworked version of "Nostalgia in Times Square," with vocals by Honi Gordon, was recorded during Mingus' 1959  Mingus Dynasty sessions and included on reissues of that album as a bonus track titled "Strollin'".

Though never a major part of Mingus’ repertoire, "Nostalgia in Times Square" has since become a jazz standard, widely performed and recorded by other musicians. Notably, jazz fusion trio Medeski Martin & Wood have long performed the song, usually as part of a medley with Sun Ra’s “Angel Race.”

Reception
The AllMusic review by Scott Yanow called the music "advanced bop that looks toward the upcoming innovations of the avant-garde and is frequently quite exciting".

Track listing
All compositions by Charles Mingus except as indicated
 "Nostalgia in Times Square" – 12:18 
 "I Can't Get Started" (Vernon Duke, Ira Gershwin) – 10:08 
 "No Private Income Blues" – 12:51 
 "Alice's Wonderland" – 8:54
Recorded at the Nonagon Art Gallery in New York City on January 16, 1959

Personnel
Charles Mingus – bass
John Handy – alto saxophone
Booker Ervin – tenor saxophone (tracks 1, 3 & 4)
Richard Wyands – piano
Dannie Richmond – drums

References

Charles Mingus live albums
1959 live albums
United Artists Records live albums
Albums produced by Alan Douglas (record producer)